The Rue Foyatier is a street on the Montmartre  ("outlier"), in the 18th arrondissement of Paris. Opened in 1867, it was given its current name in 1875, after the sculptor Denis Foyatier (1793–1863). One of the most famous streets in Paris, it consists of flights of stairs giving access to the top of the hill, the Sacré-Cœur Basilica, and the other attractions of the upper-Montmartre neighborhood. The Montmartre funicular runs alongside it.

References 

Foyatier
Montmartre